David Reeka is a Papua New Guinean rugby league footballer who represented Papua New Guinea at the 1995 World Cup. He played in one match at the tournament, coming off the bench against Tonga. 

Reeka later coached Tarangau in the Lae rugby league competition.

References

Living people
Papua New Guinean rugby league players
Papua New Guinea national rugby league team players
Lae Bombers players
Papua New Guinean rugby league coaches
Place of birth missing (living people)
Year of birth missing (living people)